'Everyday II' is the third extended play by the South Korean girl group Girl's Day. It was released on April 18, 2012.

Track listing 
The tracks are as follows:

References 

2012 albums